Isaac Erb Bowman (17August 18323September 1897) was an Ontario businessman and political figure. He represented Waterloo North in the House of Commons of Canada as a Liberal member from 1867 to 1878 and from 1887 to 1896.

He was born Isaac Erb Baumann in Woolwich Township in Upper Canada in 1832, the son of John B. Bowman; his parents had moved there from Pennsylvania in 1820.  He attended school at the Rockwood Academy in Rockwood, Ontario.  For a time, he taught school in the region. Bowman was a partner in a business that sold books in Berlin (later known as Kitchener) and in a tannery in St. Jacobs. He served as clerk and treasurer for the township and was also postmaster for St. Jacobs. He served as president of the Ontario Mutual Life Insurance Company and the Mercantile Fire Insurance Company. He was elected to the Legislative Assembly of the Province of Canada in an 1864 by-election for the North riding of Waterloo and he was acclaimed in the same riding after Confederation. He was defeated by Hugo Kranz when he ran for reelection in 1878; Bowman defeated Kranz to win the seat in 1887 and 1891.

Bowman married Lydia Bowman. He died at Waterloo on 3 September 1897. He is buried at the Calvary United Brethren Cemetery in St. Jacobs.

His son Charles Martin Bowman later became a member of the Legislative Assembly of Ontario.

References

Further reading
 

1832 births
1897 deaths
Members of the Legislative Assembly of the Province of Canada from Canada West
Liberal Party of Canada MPs
Members of the House of Commons of Canada from Ontario
People from Woolwich, Ontario